QARMA (from Qualcomm ARM Authenticator) is a lightweight tweakable block cipher primarily known for its use in the ARMv8 architecture for protection of software as a cryptographic hash for the Pointer Authentication Code. The cipher was proposed by Roberto Avanzi in 2016. Two versions of QARMA are defined: QARMA-64 (64-bit block size with a 128-bit encryption key) and QARMA-128 (128-bit block size with a 256-bit key). The design of the QARMA was influenced by PRINCE and MANTIS. The cipher is intended for fully-unrolled hardware implementations with low latency (like memory encryption). Unlike the XTS mode, the address can be directly used as a tweak and does not need to be whitened with the block encryption first.

Architecture 

QARMA is an Even-Mansour cipher using three stages, with whitening keys w0 and w1 XORed in between:
 permutation F is using core key k0 and parameterized by a tweak T. It has r rounds inside (r = 7 for QARMA-64, r = 11 for QARMA-128);
 "central" permutation C is using key k1 and is designed to be reversible via a simple key transformation (contains two central rounds);
 the third permutation is an inverse of the first (r more rounds).  
All keys are derived from the master encryption key K using specialisation:
 K is partitioned into halves as w0 Concatenation k0, each will have halfsize bits;
 for encryption w1 = (w0 >>> 1) + (w0 >> (halfsize-1));
 for encryption k1 = k0;
 for decryption, the same design can be used as long as k0+α is used as a core key, k1 = Q•k0, w1 and w0 are swapped. α here is a special constant and Q a special involutary matrix. This construct is similar to the alpha reflection in PRINCE.

The data is split into 16 cells (4-bit nibbles for QARMA-64, 8-bit bytes for QARMA-128). Internal state also contains 16 cells, arranged in a 4x4 matrix, and is initialized by plaintext (XORed with w0).
  is ShuffleCells, a MIDORI permutation of cells ([ 0, 11, 6, 13, 10, 1, 12, 7, 5, 14, 3, 8, 15, 4, 9, 2]);
  is MixColumns: each column is multiplied by a fixed matrix M;
  is SubCells: each cell is transformed using an S-box.
The tweak for each round is updated using :
  is a cell permutation from MANTIS ([ 6, 5, 14, 15, 0, 1, 2, 3, 7, 12, 13, 4, 8, 9, 10, 11]);
  is an LFSR applied to each of the cells with numbers [0, 1, 3, 4, 8, 11, 13].
The rounds of  consist of inverse operations .
Central rounds, in addition to two rounds ( and ), include multiplication of the state by an involutary matrix Q.

References

Sources

External links 
 Public-domain Python implementation of QARMA-64
 Open-source (MIT license) implementation of QARMA-64 in C

Block ciphers